Norman Leslie Oliver (15 August 1922 – 27 June 1944) was an Australian rules footballer who played with Collingwood in the Victorian Football League (VFL). He was also a talented tennis player, and there was a possibility of him being a future Davis Cup player.

Family
Son of Harold George Oliver (1893-1968), and Gladys Elizabeth Ann Oliver (1894-1961), née Atherton, Norman Leslie Oliver was born on 15 August 1922.

Military service
Serving as a Flying Officer in the RAAF during World War II, he was killed when his Kittyhawk plane crashed on a beach in New Guinea.

See also
 List of Victorian Football League players who died on active service

Footnotes

References

Holmesby, Russell & Main, Jim (2007). The Encyclopedia of AFL Footballers. 7th ed. Melbourne: Bas Publishing.
 World War Two Nominal Roll: Flying Officer Norman Leslie Oliver (436020).
 Roll of Honour: Flying Officer Norman Leslie Oliver (436020), Australian War Memorial.
 Roll of Honour Circular: Flying Officer Norman Leslie Oliver (436020), Collection of the Australian War Memorial.
 Flying Officer Norman Leslie Oliver (436020), Commonwealth War Graves Commission.

External links

 Forever Collingwood: Norm Oliver (1940-1941).

1922 births
1944 deaths
Collingwood Football Club players
Australian military personnel killed in World War II
Royal Australian Air Force officers
Royal Australian Air Force personnel of World War II
People educated at Melbourne High School
Australian World War II pilots
Australian rules footballers from Melbourne
Military personnel from Melbourne